The Prunéřov Power Station (EPRU) was the largest coal-fired power station in the Czech Republic with an installed capacity of 1,490 MW. Unit I (EPRU I, 4 x 110 MW) was shut down in June 2020, while recently modernized Unit II (EPRU II, 3 x 250 MW) continues to operate. Besides the electricity, it also supplies heat to the towns of Chomutov, Jirkov, and Klášterec nad Ohří. The installed capacity for heat generation is 500 MW. The station is located near Kadaň and operated by ČEZ Group.

According to the study Dirty Thirty, issued in May 2007 by the WWF, Prunéřov Power Station was the twelfth-worst power station in Europe in terms of the relation of energy efficiency to carbon dioxide emissions.

CEZ planned to modernize unit 2, a plan which was challenged in 2010 by Micronesia in the framework of the Espoo Convention on the grounds that the expansion of the power station would impact global warming and through this the environment of Micronesia.  According to the Czech environment ministry that modernization plan does not include best available technology.  On January 26, 2010 Czech minister of the Environment Martin Bursík (Green Party member) informed he was calling in international experts to carry out an environmental impact assessment of plans to modernize the power station.  In March he publicly released the report from Det Norske Veritas, that proved lack of best available technology in the CEZ plan EIA.  Shortly after this Minister Dusík resigned, claiming he was under pressure from prime minister Jan Fischer to approve CEZ plan EIA.  As a result, the Green party also withdrew his second minister from government. After a short lead by Minister of Agriculture Jakub Šebesta, former CEZ employee Rút Bízková was appointed as Minister of the Environment and after two weeks in office he approved CEZ plan EIA in April.

See also 

 Energy in the Czech Republic
 List of least carbon efficient power stations

References

External links 
 
 Prunerov Power Station at cez.cz

Chimneys in the Czech Republic
Coal-fired power stations in the Czech Republic